Resham is a Pakistani film and television actress and model.

She made her film debut with Jeeva in 1995, and was a leading actress of Lollywood during the 1990s. Her notable film credits include Jeeva (1995), Ghunghat (1996), Dupatta Jal Raha Hai (1998), Pal Do Pal (1999), and Swaarangi (2015). She won a National Award for Best Actress for her performance in the film Sangam (1997), and the Nigar Best Actress Award for the film Jannat Ki Talash (1999).

Early life and career
Resham got her early education from Lahore and studied till matriculation (10th grade of high school). She has a Punjabi family background. She lost her mother at the age of seven and was raised by her elder sister. Resham started her career with the film Jeeva in 1995, although before Jeeva, she played minor roles in television dramas. She then starred in several commercially successful films throughout the 1990s, including Chor Machaye Shor and Ghunghat (both 1996), Sangam (1997) – for which she received a National Award for Best Actress, Dupatta Jal Raha Hai (1998), and Inteha (1999). She continued to portray leading and supporting roles in Pakistani films until the decline of Lollywood in the early 2000s.

In 2011, she made a cameo appearance in the film Love Mein Ghum, which was directed by her friend and former co-star Reema Khan. She made her proper comeback to films with the social-drama Swaarangi in 2014, which highlighted the issue of drug addiction and the impact of it on the lives of addicts and their families. The film was a commercial failure, and was banned in several cities throughout the country. In 2017, she participated in a fashion week organized by the Pakistan Fashion Design Council (PFDC).

From 2017 to 2019, she played the pivotal role of Sajna Sapairan (a snake charmer) in the supernatural drama series Naagin, which is Pakistan's first-ever television serial based on the subject of Ichchhadhaari Naagin. In an interview, she described her character in the show as a "negative character but quite glamorous". In November 2018, Resham joined the cast of the romantic film Kaaf Kangana, written and directed by Khalil-ur-Rehman Qamar. She quit the film in the same month due to professional reasons.

In 2019, she played the role of a spiritual woman in the television series Noor Bibi. The same year, she starred opposite Agha Ali in another television series titled Muthi Bhar Chahat.

Personal life 
In June 2017, Resham announced that she would be getting married in 2018. Her husband was said to be a businessman in Europe and that she would also move there after her marriage. She denied these reports in 2019.

In April 2018, soon after Meesha Shafi's allegations of sexual harassment against Ali Zafar, Resham supported Zafar, stating: "Ali knows the difference between friendship and harassment. He cannot do such a thing."

Charity work 
During the 2010 floods, Resham sent a truck carrying flood relief (including items such as mineral water, pulses, and milk) to the affected areas through the Express Helpline Trust. Her first truck was sent to Rahim Yar Khan and the second to Kot Addu. Talking about her contributions, Resham stated: "I, as a person and as an actor, felt that it was my social responsibility to help these people from my own money instead of requesting aid from others."

In 2011, she visited Lahore's Bari Studio and distributed money amongst struggling actors, technicians, and dancers.

Awards and recognition

Selected filmography

Television

See also 
 List of Pakistani actresses

References

External links

20th-century Pakistani actresses
21st-century Pakistani actresses
Living people
Nigar Award winners
Pakistani film actresses
Pakistani television actresses
Punjabi people
Recipients of the Pride of Performance
Year of birth missing (living people)